The Chute Boxe Academy (Kick-Boxing) is a Brazilian martial arts academy. It opened as a Muay Thai academy in 1978 in Curitiba, Paraná, Brazil. Head trainer Rudimar Fedrigo later expanded the program in 1991 to include other aspects of modern mixed martial arts, such as wrestling and submission grappling. By 1995, the Chute Boxe team was considered a prime training ground for Vale Tudo fighters. In 2004, an American branch, Chute Boxe USA, was established in Los Angeles, California.

Chute Boxe fighters are characterized by being extremely aggressive and physical, well-rounded fighters.

History

Beginnings
In the 1970s, in search of a more full contact martial art, Taekwondo black belt  learned Muay Thai and brought it to Brazil. He moved to Curitiba and in 1978 his student Rudimar Fedrigo would found the Chute Boxe academy.

The style developed by Nélio Naja and his students had more emphasis on various kicks (due many of the early Brazilian Thai boxers coming from Taekwondo and Kyokushin Karate) but soon, the "Chute Boxe" style of Muay Thai became characterized as extremely aggressive, with wild combinations, hard low kicks and usually lacking in defense, trying to defeat their opponents as fast as possible.

The Chute Boxe team first made a name for themselves in the MMA world during the late 1990s in the Brazilian vale tudo promotion known as the International Vale Tudo Championship (IVC). With an aggressive and physical style focused around their muay thai skills, Chute Boxe fighters captured three of the four title belts in the promotion (Wanderlei Silva winning the light heavyweight belt, José Landi-Jons winning the middleweight belt, and Rafael Cordeiro winning the lightweight belt). The promotion ended up serving as a spring board for the Chute Boxe team (as well as many other Brazilian MMA stars) into the lucrative Japanese MMA market. For Chute Boxe specifically, it would help to launch their careers in Japan's PRIDE FC.

PRIDE FC dynasty
The major cog of the Chute Boxe machine in PRIDE was Wanderlei Silva. Known for an exciting, brawling style complete with lethal knees and leaping stomps, he would exemplify Chute Boxe style martial arts in PRIDE's middleweight division and eventually win the 2003 PRIDE FC Middleweight Grand Prix and the PRIDE FC middleweight title which he would hold for 5 1/2 years.

Coming off of a disappointing five-round decision loss to Tito Ortiz at UFC 25: Ultimate Japan, Silva would return to PRIDE to earn the biggest victory of his career to that point over the Lion's Den's Guy Mezger. It would be 20 fights and over four years before he would lose again in a controversial decision to superheavyweight Mark Hunt. During this span he defeated notable fighters Kazushi Sakuraba (three times), Quinton “Rampage” Jackson (twice), Yuki Kondo, Ikuhisa Minowa, Hidehiko Yoshida, Kiyoshi Tamura, Dan Henderson, Alexander Otsuka, Shungo Oyama, Hiromitsu Kanehara, and would draw with Mirko "Cro Cop" Filipović.

His aura of invincibility wouldn't truly be broken until a decision loss to Ricardo Arona in the 2005 PRIDE FC middle weight Grand Prix. His loss would be avenged later that night by teammate and rising star, Mauricio “Shogun” Rua. Silva is noted to have never lost under full PRIDE FC rules at his weight class; PRIDE's event in Las Vegas had altered rules.

Enter the Rua brothers
As the older of the Rua brothers, Murilo “Ninja” Rua had a mediocre run during his years with PRIDE FC. Wins over Mario Sperry, Akira Shoji and Alexander Otsuka established him as a  contender in the organization. His younger brother Mauricio "Shogun" Rua would also enter the PRIDE fighting championships and would prove the most successful fighter produced by Chute Boxe under Wanderlei Silva's and Ninja's guidance.

Younger than Murilo by about a year and a half, “Shogun” has defeated a who's who list of fighters including Evangelista “Cyborg” Santos, Akira Shoji, Akihiro Gono, Quinton "Rampage" Jackson, Alistair Overeem (twice), Antônio Rogério “Minotouro” Nogueira, Ricardo Arona, Kevin Randleman, Mark Coleman, Chuck Liddell, and Lyoto Machida. Shogun was the UFC light heavyweight champion until losing his first title defense against Jon Jones at UFC 128. His exciting, fan-friendly style includes much of the standard Chute Boxe Muay Thai clinch work, knees, stomps, and soccer kicks, as well as polished Brazilian Jiu Jitsu.

Rivalry with Brazilian Top Team
The opposite number in terms of Brazilian dominance in PRIDE FC was the Brazilian Top Team (BTT) which was comprised, at the time, of such fighters as Antonio Rodrigo “Minotauro” Nogueira, Ricardo Arona, and Murilo Bustamante. Both BTT and Chute Boxe were the dominant Brazilian teams at the time, representing different contrasting combat philosophies: Chute Boxe was mostly based in a very aggressive Muay Thai style, while BTT was founded by Carlson Gracie's students and had a more well-rounded BJJ-based approach. While there were some tensions between the team, the rivalry was thought ended after a discussion-turned-brawl between Ricardo Arona and Wanderlei Silva at the Tokyo Hilton hotel in the eve of Pride 20 in 2002. The same event saw the first confrontation between both teams, matching Chute Boxe's representative Murílo "Ninja" Rua against BTT's Mário Sperry. Competition between the two teams was hardly limited to the Pride scene however. Matches between fighters of the two organizations had taken place in Brazil, Portugal and other parts of the world before, but perhaps the most interesting chapter of the rivalry took place on August 28, 2005 at the 2005 PRIDE FC middle weight Grand Prix.

The 2005 PRIDE FC middleweight Grand Prix would be the first such competition for newcomers Mauricio Rua and BTT's Ricardo Arona. Both scored impressive victories over highly regarded veterans Alistair Overeem and middleweight champ Wanderlei Silva respectively. It was Arona's victory over the latter that would stoke the flames of the rivalry because until then Silva had been the torch-bearer for Chute Boxe. Later that night, however, “Shogun” would pick up the torch with a thoroughly dominating first-round KO of Arona, ultimately finishing him on the ground which was considered Arona's strength.

Another notable aspect of this period is that it shortly followed the departure of promising prospect Anderson Silva.  Silva had noted several disputes with Chute Boxe's management as reasons for leaving the team and shortly began training with some of Brazilian Top Team's best in the Nogueira brothers.  He was quoted in an ESPN article as stating that friendships formed with his former rivals helped to save his career upon his departure from Chute Boxe.

Post-Pride era
With the demise of PRIDE FC in late 2007, coinciding with the departure of its first mass-appeal superstar Wanderlei Silva around the same time, Chute Boxe entered a new era. Moreover, the Rua brothers, Mauricio and Murilo, and Andre "Dida" Amade, also departed Chute Boxe to start their own gym. One of the top instructors, Rafael Cordeiro, also left around that time to found his own gym in the US, Kings MMA. 
However, up and coming fighters, such as lightweight Jean Silva, have augmented their talent. In addition, fighter Evangelista Santos has recently competed in Strikeforce as well as his ex-wife, female fighter Cristiane "Cyborg" Santos, who is currently Chute Boxe's most marketable fighter.

Notable former Chute Boxe fighters 
 Wanderlei Silva (former PRIDE Middleweight Champion), left Chute Boxe in 2007 to train with Xtreme Couture. In 2008 Silva opened a new gym under the banner "Wand Fight Team".
 Mauricio Rua (PRIDE 2005 Middleweight Grand Prix champion and former UFC champion light heavyweight), left Chute Boxe in 2007 and founded Universidade da Luta.
 Murilo Rua (former Elite XC Middleweight Champion), left Chute Boxe in 2007 and founded Universidade da Luta.
 Anderson Silva (former UFC middleweight champion), left Chute Boxe in 2003 to start MuayThai Dream Team. Left MuayThai Dream Team to start at Black House.
 Gabriel Gonzaga, left Chute Boxe in 2006 to move to Ludlow, Massachusetts, to join Team Link.
 Assuerio Silva, left Chute Boxe in 2003 to start MuayThai Dream Team.
 Thiago Silva, left Chute Boxe in 2008 and joined American Top Team.
 Kazushi Sakuraba, trained with former rival Wanderlei Silva at Chute Boxe in preparation for his bout with Ken Shamrock in 2005.
 Andre Dida, left Chute Boxe in 2007 and founded Universidade da Luta.
 Cristiano Marcello, left Chute Boxe in 2009 to focus on with his own martial arts academy, CM System.
 Jorge Patino, started Gold Team Fighters USA/Gold Team Fighters Houston.
 Mariusz Linke, first Polish born BJJ black belt, briefly trained with Cristiano Marcello and Jorge Patino.
Luiz Azeredo, former PRIDE FC Lightweight title challenger. 
Rafael Cordeiro, left Chute Boxe in 2007 and founded Kings MMA.

See also
 List of Top Professional MMA Training Camps

References

1978 establishments in Brazil
Mixed martial arts training facilities
Kickboxing training facilities
Brazilian jiu-jitsu training facilities
Muay Thai